Die Windrose (The Windrose) was a film made for the East German production company DEFA in 1957 and commissioned by the World Federation of Women. Alberto Cavalcanti was film director, with artistic input from Joris Ivens.  Simone Signoret, Yves Montand and Helene Weigel, wife of German dramatist Bertold Brecht. All collaborated in the making of this film, a docu-drama about the struggle of female workers in Italy, Brazil, the Soviet Union, China and France, united as "pioneers of the way which leads to a better future".

Cast
Angela Brunner	...	(voice)
Aracy Cardoso		
Valdo César		
Marlene França		
Armida Gianassi	...	Giovanna
Yves Montand		
Vanja Orico		
Carla Pozzi		
Simone Signoret	
Aurélio Teixeira		
Miguel Torres		
Helene Weigel
Yen Mei-yi
Zinaida Kirienko

References

External links
 

1957 films
1957 drama films
East German films
German anthology films
Films directed by Alberto Cavalcanti
Films directed by Joris Ivens
Films directed by Sergei Gerasimov
Films directed by Gillo Pontecorvo
Films shot in Brazil
Films shot in China
Films shot in France
Films shot in Italy
Films shot in Russia
1950s German films